Stephanie Klick is an American nurse and politician. A Republican, she has represented District 91 in the Texas House of Representatives since 2013. She served one term as Majority Leader of the Texas House's GOP Caucus.

Education and nursing career
Klick earned a Bachelor of Science in nursing from Texas Christian University in 1981 and a Master of Public Health from Texas A&M College of Veterinary Medicine & Biomedical Sciences in 1983.

Klick worked as a nurse and nursing supervisor at North Hills Medical Center for 30 years.

Political career

In November 2012, Klick was elected to represent House District 91, which includes parts of Tarrant, Collin, Dallas, Fort Worth and Arlington counties. She served as the chairwoman of the Tarrant County Party for six years. Klick has sponsored bills to legalize medical marijuana.

References

External links
 
 House District 91

|-

1956 births
21st-century American women
American women nurses
Living people
Republican Party members of the Texas House of Representatives
Texas A&M University alumni
Texas Christian University alumni
Women state legislators in Texas